Leucine rich repeat containing 25 is a protein that in humans is encoded by the LRRC25 gene.

References

Further reading